Kassoum Ouédraogo Zico Académie de Football (or simply KOZAF)  is a Burkinabé football club based in Ouagadougou. The team has played in the Burkinabé Premier League, but was delegated to the Burkinabé Deuxième Division after the 2020-2021 season. They play their home games at the Stade Municipal.

The club was founded by former international footballer Kassoum Ouédraogo.

The club colours are orange and yellow.

References

External links
Official website
Team profile – soccerway.com

Football clubs in Burkina Faso
Sport in Ouagadougou